Henleophytum is a genus in the Malpighiaceae, a family of about 75 genera of flowering plants in the order Malpighiales. Henleophytum includes one species, Henleophytum echinatum, a woody twining vine with bristly fruits native to thickets on limestone in Cuba.

External links
Malpighiaceae Malpighiaceae - description, taxonomy, phylogeny, and nomenclature
Henleophytum

Flora of Cuba
Malpighiaceae